is a Japanese samurai family group.  It can refer to one of five different Japanese clans, including

One claimed descent from the Taira clan. One famous descendant was the Sengoku period samurai general Oyamada Nobushige.
One was descended from the Usa clan.
One claimed descent from the Northern Fujiwara by way of Uesugi Shigefusa.
One claimed descent from the Northern Fujiwara by way of Onomiya Saneyori.
One claimed descent from the Northern Fujiwara by way of Kikuchi Noritaka.

References
 "Oyamada-shi" (Taira descent) on Harimaya.com (accessed 28 August 2008)

Japanese clans

ja:小山田氏